Radio France Internationale, usually referred to as RFI, is the state-owned international radio news network of France. With 37.2 million listeners in 2014, it is one of the most-listened-to international radio stations in the world, along with Deutsche Welle, the BBC World Service, the Voice of America, Radio Netherlands Worldwide, and China Radio International.

RFI broadcasts 24 hours per day around the world in French and in 12 other languages in FM, shortwave, medium wave, satellite and on its website. It is a channel of the state company France Médias Monde. The majority of shortwave transmissions are in French and Hausa but also includes some hours of Swahili, Portuguese, Mandinka, and Russian. RFI broadcasts to over 150 countries on 5 continents. Africa is the largest part of radio listeners, representing 60% of the total audience in 2010. In the Paris region, RFI comprises between 150,000 and 200,000 listeners.

In 2007, the audience was of 46.1 million listeners, breaking down into 27.5 million in Africa, 10.5 million in the Middle East, 4.2 million in the Americas, 2.2 million in Europe and 1.7 million in Asia-Oceania.

History

RFI was created in 1975 as part of Radio France by the Government of France, and replaced the Poste Colonial (created in 1931), Paris-Mondial (1937), Radio Paris (1939), a private station which was commandeered by the Germans during the occupation of France, and the Voice of France which was operated by the Vichy regime from 1941 to 1944, RTF Radio Paris (1945) and ORTF Radio Paris (1965). In 1986 the French Parliament changed the law to allow RFI to operate independently of Radio France.

RFI operates under the auspices and primary budget of the Ministry for Europe and Foreign Affairs. It broadcasts primarily in French, but also in English, Swahili, Hausa, Spanish, Portuguese, Romanian, Russian, Persian, Chinese, Vietnamese, Cambodian and as of 2015, Manding. As of 2 April 2020, the English service has ceased broadcasting, replaced by a selection of French music.

It also owns Monte Carlo Doualiya (formerly Radio Monte Carlo Middle East), which produces Arabic programmes in Paris, and airs them from a transmitter in Cyprus to audiences across the Middle East and North Africa.

Incidents 
On 17 September 2002, Togolese President Gnassingbé Eyadéma tried to stop the broadcasting of an interview with one of his opponents, Agbéyomé Kodjo, by phoning directly to the Elysée Palace. The interview was not censored by Jean-Paul Cluzel, RFI's CEO at the time, due to the coordinated intervention of the journalists' trade unions. However, a report raising questions regarding the French secret services responsibilities in the 1995 death of judge Bernard Borrel in Djibouti, which was broadcast on 17 May 2005, was later removed from RFI's website for undisclosed reasons, possibly due to the intervention of Djiboutian President Ismail Omar Guelleh.

On 21 October 2003, Jean Hélène was reporting for RFI during the civil war in Ivory Coast when he was killed in Abidjan by police sergeant Théodore Séry Dago.

On 2 November 2013, RFI reporting team Ghislaine Dupont and Claude Verlon were murdered while covering the Mali elections. The United Nations set their death date to commemorate the International Day of Impunity each year.

In November 2020, RFI mistakenly published numerous obituaries of famous people on its own web site, as well as sending them to related web sites, after moving draft stories  to a new system.

Podcasts
RFI offers a daily podcast in simple French, accessible via iTunes, named Journal en français facile. There are also several other podcasts including the weekly Afrique Presse, which is hosted by Assane Diop and discusses the most important news in Africa that week.

Slogans
    « The world's radio! » (1987 - 1996)
    « And the news become worldwide » (2010 - 2013)
    « Voices of the world » (from 2013)

See also

 France 24
 List of international radio broadcasters

References

Bibliography

External links

  
 English-language site 
 RFI Hausa service
 RFI English Facebook Page
 RFI Music programme on Facebook World Tracks 
 RFI English language Music section
 Music biographies in the RFI English language website

1975 establishments in France
Publicly funded broadcasters
Radio in France
Radio France
International broadcasters
Radio stations established in 1975
Multilingual news services
France Médias Monde